WCEZ (93.9 FM, "Z93") is a Classic Rock formatted broadcast radio station licensed to Carthage, Illinois, serving the Keokuk Area.  WCEZ is owned and operated by Michael Greenwald and Leah Jones, Keokuk Broadcasting Inc. The station highlights local music Sunday evenings, is an affiliate of the Iowa Hawkeyes, syndicated Nights With Alice Cooper and, syndicated Pink Floyd show "Floydian Slip."  The station plays Rock music from the 70's through today.

External links

CEZ
Radio stations established in 2001
2001 establishments in Illinois